Ivan Udarević (born 18 November 1982) is a Croatian retired footballer who played as a defender.

Career
Udarević previously played for NK Inter Zaprešić in the Croatian First League.

References

External links
 

1982 births
Living people
Sportspeople from Osijek
Association football defenders
Croatian footballers
Croatia youth international footballers
NK Belišće players
Polonia Warsaw players
NK Inter Zaprešić players
APOEL FC players
ŁKS Łódź players
Flota Świnoujście players
Motor Lublin players
Odra Opole players
Croatian Football League players
Ekstraklasa players
Cypriot First Division players
I liga players
II liga players
III liga players
Croatian expatriate footballers
Expatriate footballers in Cyprus
Croatian expatriate sportspeople in Cyprus
Expatriate footballers in Poland
Croatian expatriate sportspeople in Poland